Marion House and Marion Brothers Store also known as Jubal E. Marion—Richard Nathaniel Marion House and Oakcrest, is a historic home and general store located at Siloam, Surry County, North Carolina. The house was built over three periods in 1861, 1895, and 1913. It is a two-story, three bay, double pile, Classical Revival, Southern Colonial style frame dwelling. The 1913 remodeling was by prominent Winston-Salem architect Willard C. Northup. It features a two-story, Ionic order central portico and a one-story porch with Tuscan order columns that nearly encircles the house. The Marion Brothers Store was built about 1894, and is a two-story, brick commercial building.  The property also includes the contributing wash house/smokehouse, a garage with a tool room/shop and a pump room, a fish pool, a carbide house, two chicken houses, a barn, a corn crib / granary, and two tobacco barns.

It was listed on the National Register of Historic Places in 2012.

References 

Houses on the National Register of Historic Places in North Carolina
Commercial buildings on the National Register of Historic Places in North Carolina
Neoclassical architecture in North Carolina
Houses completed in 1913
Commercial buildings completed in 1894
Houses in Surry County, North Carolina
National Register of Historic Places in Surry County, North Carolina
1913 establishments in North Carolina